Robert Holden is a British landscape architect born in Preston and educated at the University of Newcastle upon Tyne. Later a director of Brian Clouston and Partners, and director of the MA Landscape Architecture programme at the University of Greenwich. From 2004 he served as Secretary General of the European Foundation for Landscape Architecture. Robert Holden has been described as the leading European landscape architecture critic of his generation.

Books
Robert Holden is the author of
International Landscape Design, Laurence King, London, 1996
New Landscape Design, Architectural Press, London, 2003
Construction for Landscape Architecture, with Jamie Liversedge, Laurence King Publishing (2011)   
with Jamie Liversedge Techniques et détails de construction en architecture paysagère, (2011)  Dunod
La Construccion en el Proyecto del Paisaje, with Jamie Liversedge (2011) 978-8425223907 Gustavo Gil
 景观建筑工程 with Jamie Liversedge(2013)   电子工业出版社
Fieldwork, with Lisa Diedrich and Eric Luiten (eds)  (2006)   Birkhaüser
Fieldwork : L'architecture du paysage en Europe, with Lisa Diedrich and Eric Luiten (eds)  (2006)  Infolio
Fieldwork. Landschaftsarchitektur Europa, with Lisa Diedrich and Eric Luiten (eds)  (2006)   Birkhaüser
Fieldwork Landschapsarchitectuur in Europa, with Lisa Diedrich and Eric Luiten (eds)   (2006)  TOTH
New Landscape Design,: (2003)   Laurence King
Nueva Arquitectura del Paisaje, (2004) 978-9688874028 Gustavo Gil
新景观设计(精),  ( 2004)  云南科技出版社
International Landscape Design, (1996)   Calmann King
Urban Parks,with John Merivale and Tom Turner  (1992)  The Landscape Institute

References

English landscape architects
Alumni of Newcastle University
Academics of the University of Greenwich
Living people
Architects from Preston, Lancashire
Year of birth missing (living people)